Sanjay Batra is a television actor in India. He has played roles in many popular TV serials like Jyoti, Balika Vadhu, Iss Pyaar Ko Kya Naam Doon?.

Filmography

Television

Web series

References

Living people
Indian male television actors
21st-century Indian male actors
Indian male soap opera actors
Place of birth missing (living people)
1965 births
Actors from Mumbai